Opération Baliste was a French aeronaval operation off Lebanon aimed at securing citizens of the European Union in the context of the 2006 Lebanon War.

Components 

Opération Baliste employed 1,700 men under Counter Admiral Xavier Magne. The operation was threefold :
 An aerial transport group, composed with one Transall C-160 and 3 Eurocopter Cougar
 A battlegroup of the French Army, including motorised infantry, engineering, ALAT and light armour.
The group had hospital capabilities, combat helicopters, transport helicopters, and landing craft.

History 
On 18 August 2006, 14,500 people had been evacuated (including 11,300 French citizens). On 20 August, the amphibious assault ship  and the frigate  sailed from Toulon to join the theatre and convoy elements from the 2nd and 13th Regiments of Engineering, as well as over 100 engineering vehicles for the UNIFIL

On 3 October, an Israeli fighter penetrated the  defence perimeter of the stealth frigate , triggering a diplomatic incident. Israel apologised after official protests from the French government.

References

External links 
 French Defence Ministry

2006 Lebanon War
Battles involving the French Foreign Legion
France–Israel relations
France–Lebanon relations
Military operations involving France